Hajji Dede Edmond Brahimaj (born May 19, 1959), commonly known as Baba Mondi, is an Albanian religious leader and the eighth Bektashi Dedebaba (or Kryegjysh) of the Bektashi Order. He is the world leader of the Bektashi Muslims.

Early life 
Edmond Brahimaj was born to devout Bektashi Muslims in Vlorë, Albania. He finished the middle school in Vlorë and is graduated from the Military Academy. Beginning in 1982, he was an officer of the Albanian Armed Forces. He also served in military functions of Burrel and Peshkopi. At the beginning of 1991, he was released from his military duty. After January 2, 1992, he studied at the Dedebabalik and became a dervish in May 16, 1996.

Bektashi leadership 
On June 11, 2011, Baba Edmond Brahimaj was chosen as the head of the Bektashi order by a council of Albanian babas.

References 

1959 births
Bektashi Order
People from Vlorë
Albanian Sufis
Albanian religious leaders
Living people
Bektashi dedebabas